Emma McCagg, born Katharine Emma McCagg, is a New York-based painter and filmmaker.

Biography

Emma McCagg was born in Concord, Massachusetts and began making drawings as a child of which some of these appeared in her first documentary feature entitled There's Something About John. 

McCagg attended Friends Seminary in New York City and traveled to Europe to study art. In London, she enrolled at the Byam Shaw School of Art to study painting. While there, she met Graham Nickson, a visiting professor, who would later be the Dean of the New York Studio School where McCagg would also later study. Upon returning to New York City, she attended and received a B.A. from Sarah Lawrence College. She would later attend Boston University where she obtained an MA in journalism. In between attending Sarah Lawrence College and Boston University, she worked at the Lewisboro Ledger where she did investigative reporting and was one of the first journalists to write on the Kathleen Durst disappearance. Upon graduating from Boston University, she enrolled in the New York Studio School were two paintings made during this time were included in the yearly book of juried "open studios competition" entitled New American Paintings. McCagg's two-large scale oil paintings, Julie (1997) and Patrick (1997), were selected for inclusion by the noted American art dealer, gallerist, and author Ivan Karp. She is currently represented by Pristine Galerie, Monterrey, Mexico, and by Koscielak Gallery, Chicago, USA, before founder and director, Gosia Koscielak, passed on in 2021.

Awards

References

External links
IMDb
New York Foundation for the Arts

20th-century American women artists
American contemporary artists
American documentary filmmakers
Boston University alumni

Sarah Lawrence College alumni

Living people

Year of birth missing (living people)
People from New York City
People from Concord, Massachusetts